Makobo Modjadji VI (Makobo Caroline Modjadji; 1978 – 12 June 2005) was the sixth in a line of the Balobedu tribe's Rain Queens. It is believed that Makobo Modjadji had the ability to control the clouds and rivers. Makobo was crowned on 16 April 2003 at the age of 25, after the death of her predecessor and grandmother, Queen Mokope Modjadji. This made her the youngest Queen in the history of the Balobedu tribe. It is still argued who will be her successor, but it's thought her son will be the first Rain King in 200 years.

Life
Makobo was the daughter of Princess Leakhale Maria Modjadji and was the only Rain Queen to be formally educated. She was crowned Rain Queen in 2003, two years after the death of her grandmother Rain Queen Mokope Mokope Modjadji. Her mother, the designated successor, had died at a very young age long before her mother Mokope Modjadji died in 2000, therefore Makobo was selected as the next Rain Queen. On the day of the coronation, a slight drizzle fell, which was interpreted as a good omen. The coronation was an elaborate ceremony, but it is believed that Makobo accepted the crown reluctantly.

Although respected for her abilities and lineage, Makobo was seen as too modern to be the next Rain Queen, which may have been why there was such a long delay before she was crowned. Custom dictated that rain queens live reclusive lives, hidden in the royal kraal with the "royal wives". Makobo Modjadji, however, liked to wear jeans and T-shirts, visit nearby discos, watch soap operas and chat on her cell phone.

Modjadji also had a boyfriend, David Mogale, who was believed to have fathered her second child. He is the former municipal manager of Greater Letaba Local Municipality. He is also rumoured to have moved into the Royal Compound to live with her. This caused great controversy with the Royal Council, as the Rain Queen is only ever supposed to have sexual intercourse with nobles who the Royal Council themselves chose.

Death and alleged conspiracy
On 10 June 2005 Makobo was admitted to the Polokwane Medi-Clinic with a then-undisclosed illness; she died two days later at the age of 27.

There is a lot of controversy surrounding the late Rain Queen's death. Some villagers believe she died from a broken heart when her lover David Mogale was banned from the Royal Village by the Royal Council. Mogale himself claims that the Royal Council poisoned Makobo, as they saw her unfit to hold the much-revered position of Rain Queen, and this was the easiest way to have her removed. Hospital staff believed she died of AIDS, while others are concerned with the disappearance of Makobo's brother, Mpapatla, last seen on the day of Makobo's death.

A fire broke out in the local chief's house, where Makobo's coffin was being kept, before her funeral. The fire was extinguished before Makobo's coffin suffered any damage, but the event seemed to arouse more suspicions of foul play surrounding Makobo's death.

Officially, Makobo died of chronic meningitis.

References

External links
 Obituary
 "Rain Queen's mysterious death could signal end of dynasty"
  — * "Women In Power From 2000." South African Balobedu People Crown 'Rain Queen'

1978 births
2005 deaths
Deaths from meningitis
Neurological disease deaths in South Africa
Infectious disease deaths in South Africa
Rain Queens
Female heirs apparent